Lee Yun-hwa (born 14 November 1985) is a South Korean badminton player. Born in Wonju, Gangwon province, Lee started playing badminton at aged nine. She educated at the Bukwon girls' middle school, after that in Yubong girls' high school. Lee joined the national team when she was 15 and trained at the Taeneung national training center. In the junior event, she competed at the Asian Junior Championships, winning a gold medal in the girls' team event in 2001, girls team silver and girls' doubles bronze medal in 2002. She also part of the national junior team that won the silver medal at the 2002 World Junior Championships. She made a debut at the Uber Cup in 2004, and captured the attention by her outstanding performance winning the singles and doubles event in the semi finals against Denmark. In the Sudirman Cup, she helped the team reaching in to the semi finals round in 2005 and 2007, clinched the bronze medal for the team. Lee who was affiliated with the Daekyo Noonoppi, helped the Korean team won the world women's team championships at the 2010 Uber Cup.

Achievements

Asian Junior Championships
Girls' doubles

BWF Grand Prix 
The BWF Grand Prix has two level such as Grand Prix and Grand Prix Gold. It is a series of badminton tournaments, sanctioned by Badminton World Federation (BWF) since 2007.

Women's singles

 BWF Grand Prix Gold tournament
 BWF Grand Prix tournament

BWF International Challenge/Series
Women's singles

 BWF International Challenge tournament
 BWF International Series tournament

References

External links
 

1985 births
Living people
People from Wonju
South Korean female badminton players
Badminton players at the 2006 Asian Games
Asian Games bronze medalists for South Korea
Asian Games medalists in badminton
Medalists at the 2006 Asian Games
Sportspeople from Gangwon Province, South Korea